Minnan or Banlam may refer to:

 Minnan region, or southern Fujian
 Southern Min, a variety of Chinese
 Hokkien people in the narrow definition
 Hokkien and Teochew people in the loose definition

People
 Denzil Minnan-Wong
 Hsieh Min-Nan